Ubuntu is a Nguni Bantu term meaning "humanity". It is sometimes translated as "I am because we are" (also "I am because you are"), or "humanity towards others" (Zulu ). In Xhosa, the latter term is used, but is often meant in a more philosophical sense to mean "the belief in a universal bond of sharing that connects all humanity".

Different names in other Bantu languages

Although the most popular name referring to the philosophy today is Ubuntu (Zulu language, South Africa), it has several other names in other Bantu languages.

The name also differs by country, such as in Angola (kimuntu), Botswana (setho), Burundi (ubuntu), Cameroon (bato), Republic of the Congo (RotC; bantu), Democratic Republic of the Congo (DRC; bomoto/bantu), Kenya (utu/munto/mondo), Malawi (umunthu), Mozambique (vumuntu), Namibia (omundu), Rwanda (ubuntu), South Africa (ubuntu/botho), Tanzania (utu/obuntu/bumuntu), Uganda (obuntu), Zambia (umunthu/ubuntu) and Zimbabwe (Ubuntu, unhu or hunhu). It is also found in other Bantu countries not mentioned here.

Definitions
There are various definitions of the word "Ubuntu". The most recent definition was provided by the African Journal of Social Work (AJSW). The journal defined ubuntu as:

There are many different (and not always compatible) definitions of what ubuntu is. Even with the various definitions, Ubuntu encompasses the interdependence of humans on another and the acknowledgment of one's responsibility to their fellow humans and the world around them. It is a philosophy that supports collectivism over individualism.  

Ubuntu asserts that society gives human beings their humanity. An example is a Zulu-speaking person who when commanding to speak in Zulu would say "khuluma isintu", which means "speak the language of people". When someone behaves according to custom, a Sotho-speaking person would say "ke motho", which means "he/she is a human". The aspect of this that would be exemplified by a tale told (often, in private quarters) in Nguni "kushone abantu ababili ne Shangaan", in Sepedi "go tlhokofetje batho ba babedi le leShangane", in English (two people died and one Shangaan). In each of these examples, humanity comes from conforming to or being part of the tribe.

According to Michael Onyebuchi Eze, the core of ubuntu can best be summarised as follows:
A person is a person through other people strikes an affirmation of one’s humanity through recognition of an "other" in his or her uniqueness and difference. It is a demand for a creative intersubjective formation in which the "other" becomes a mirror (but only a mirror) for my subjectivity. This idealism suggests to us that humanity is not embedded in my person solely as an individual; my humanity is co-substantively bestowed upon the other and me. Humanity is a quality we owe to each other. We create each other and need to sustain this otherness creation. And if we belong to each other, we participate in our creations: we are because you are, and since you are, definitely I am. The "I am" is not a rigid subject, but a dynamic self-constitution dependent on this otherness creation of relation and distance.
An "extroverted communities" aspect is the most visible part of this ideology. There is sincere warmth with which people treat both strangers and members of the community. This overt display of warmth is not merely aesthetic but enables the formation of spontaneous communities. The resultant collaborative work within these spontaneous communities transcends the aesthetic and gives functional significance to the value of warmth. Warmth is not the sine qua non of community formation but guards against instrumentalist relationships. Unfortunately, sincere warmth may leave one vulnerable to those with ulterior motives.

"Ubuntu" as political philosophy encourages community equality, propagating the distribution of wealth. This socialisation is a vestige of agrarian peoples as a hedge against the crop failures of individuals. Socialisation presupposes a community population with which individuals empathise and concomitantly, have a vested interest in its collective prosperity. Urbanisation and the aggregation of people into an abstract and bureaucratic state undermines this empathy. African intellectual historians like Michael Onyebuchi Eze have argued, however, that this idea of "collective responsibility" must not be understood as absolute in which the community's good is prior to the individual's good. On this view, ubuntu it is argued, is a communitarian philosophy that is widely differentiated from the Western notion of communitarian socialism. In fact, ubuntu induces an ideal of shared human subjectivity that promotes a community's good through an unconditional recognition and appreciation of individual uniqueness and difference. Audrey Tang has suggested that Ubuntu "implies that everyone has different skills and strengths; people are not isolated, and through mutual support they can help each other to complete themselves."

"Redemption" relates to how people deal with errant, deviant, and dissident members of the community. The belief is that man is born formless like a lump of clay. It is up to the community, as a whole, to use the fire of experience and the wheel of social control to mould him into a pot that may contribute to society. Any imperfections should be borne by the community and the community should always seek to redeem man. An example of this is the statement by the African National Congress (in South Africa) that it does not throw out its own but rather redeems.

Other scholars such as Mboti (2015) argue that the normative definition of Ubuntu, notwithstanding its intuitive appeal, is still open to doubt. The definition of Ubuntu, contends Mboti, has remained consistently and purposely fuzzy, inadequate and inconsistent. Mboti rejects the interpretation that Africans are "naturally" interdependent and harmony-seeking, and that humanity is given to a person by and through other persons. He sees a philosophical trap in attempts to elevate harmony to a moral duty – a sort of categorical imperative – that Africans must simply uphold. Mboti cautions against relying on intuitions in attempts to say what Ubuntu is or is not. He concludes that the phrase umuntu ngumuntu ngabantu references a messier, undisciplined relationship between persons, stating that: "First, there is value in regarding a broken relationship as being authentically human as much as a harmonious relationship. Second, a broken relationship can be as ethically desirable as a harmonious one. For instance, freedom follows from a break from oppression. Finally, harmonious relations can be as oppressive and false as disharmonious ones. For instance, the cowboy and his horse are in a harmonious relationship."

Ubuntu maxims or short statements

Ubuntu is often presented in short statements called maxims by Samkange (1980). Some of these are:
 Motho ke motho ka batho (Sotho/Tswana). A person is a person through other people.
 Umuntu ngumuntu ngabantu (Zulu). A person is a person through other people.
 Umntu ngumntu ngabantu (Xhosa). A person is a person through other people.
 Munhu munhu nevanhu (Shona). A person through other people.
 Ndiri nekuti tiri (Shona). I am because we are.
 Munhu i munhu hivanwani vanhu (Xitsonga). A person is a person through other people.
 Muthu ndi muthu nga vhathu (Venda). A person is a person through other people

History of the concept in African written sources
Although ubuntu has been in existence in orature (oral literature), it appeared in South African written sources from as early as the mid-19th century. Reported translations covered the semantic field of "human nature, humanness, humanity; virtue, goodness, kindness". Grammatically, the word combines the root -ntʊ̀ "person, human being" with the class 14 ubu- prefix forming abstract nouns, so that the term is exactly parallel in formation to the abstract noun humanity.

The concept was popularised in terms of a "philosophy" or "world view" (as opposed to a quality attributed to an individual) beginning in the 1950s, notably in the writings of Jordan Kush Ngubane published in the African Drum magazine. From the 1970s, the ubuntu began to be described as a specific kind of "African humanism". Based on the context of Africanisation propagated by the political thinkers in the 1960s period of decolonisation, ubuntu was used as a term for a specifically African (or Southern African) kind of humanism found in the context of the transition to majority rule in Zimbabwe and South Africa.

The first publication dedicated to ubuntu as a philosophical concept appeared in 1980, Hunhuism or Ubuntuism: A Zimbabwe Indigenous Political Philosophy (hunhu being the Shona equivalent of Nguni ubuntu) by Stanlake J. W. T. Samkange. Hunhuism or Ubuntuism is presented as political ideology for the new Zimbabwe, as Southern Rhodesia attained independence from the United Kingdom.

The concept was used in South Africa in the 1990s as a guiding ideal for the transition from apartheid to majority rule. The term appears in the Epilogue of the Interim Constitution of South Africa (1993), "there is a need for understanding but not for vengeance, a need for reparation but not for retaliation, a need for ubuntu but not for victimisation".

In South Africa, it has come to be used as a contested term for a kind of humanist philosophy, ethic, or ideology, also known as Ubuntuism propagated in the Africanisation (transition to majority rule) process of these countries during the 1980s and 1990s. New research has begun to question the exclusive "humanism" framing, and thus to suggest that ubuntu can have a "militaristic" angle - an ubuntu for warriors.

Since the transition to democracy in South Africa with the Nelson Mandela presidency in 1994, the term has become more widely known outside of Southern Africa, notably popularised to English-language readers through the ubuntu theology of Desmond Tutu. Tutu was the chairman of the South African Truth and Reconciliation Commission (TRC), and many have argued that ubuntu was a formative influence on the TRC.

By country

Zimbabwe

In the Shona language, the majority spoken language in Zimbabwe, ubuntu is unhu or hunhu. In Ndebele, it is known as ubuntu. The concept of ubuntu is viewed the same in Zimbabwe as in other African cultures. The Shona phrase munhu munhu nekuda kwevanhu means a person is human through others while ndiri nekuti tiri means I am because we are.

Stanlake J. W. T. Samkange (1980) highlights the three maxims of Hunhuism or Ubuntuism that shape this philosophy: The first maxim asserts that 'To be human is to affirm one's humanity by recognizing the humanity of others and, on that basis, establish respectful human relations with them.' And 'the second maxim means that if and when one is faced with a decisive choice between wealth and the preservation of the life of another human being, then one should opt for the preservation of life'. The third 'maxim' as a 'principle deeply embedded in traditional African political philosophy' says 'that the king owed his status, including all the powers associated with it, to the will of the people under him'.

South Africa

Ubuntu: "I am what I am because of who we all are." (From a definition offered by Liberian peace activist Leymah Gbowee.)

Archbishop Desmond Tutu offered a definition in a 1999 book:

Tutu further explained Ubuntu in 2008:.

Nelson Mandela explained Ubuntu as follows:

Tim Jackson refers to Ubuntu as a philosophy that supports the changes he says are necessary to create a future that is economically and environmentally sustainable. Judge Colin Lamont expanded on the definition during his ruling on the hate speech trial of Julius Malema:.

At Nelson Mandela's memorial, United States President Barack Obama spoke about Ubuntu, saying,

Malawi

In Malawi, the same philosophy is called "uMunthu" in the local Chewa language. According to the Catholic Diocese of Zomba bishop Rt. Rev. Fr. Thomas Msusa, "The African worldview is about living as one family, belonging to God". Msusa noted that in Africa "We say 'I am because we are', or in Chichewa kali kokha nkanyama, tili awiri ntiwanthu (when you are on your own you are as good as an animal of the wild; when there are two of you, you form a community)."

The philosophy of uMunthu has been passed on through proverbs such as Mwana wa mnzako ngwako yemwe, ukachenjera manja udya naye (your neighbor's child is your own, his/her success is your success too). Some notable Malawian uMunthu philosophers and intellectuals who have written about this worldview are Augustine Musopole, Gerard Chigona, Chiwoza Bandawe, Richard Tambulasi, Harvey Kwiyani and Happy Kayuni. This includes Malawian philosopher and theologist Harvey Sindima’s treatment of uMunthu as an important African philosophy is highlighted in his 1995 book Africa’s Agenda: The legacy of liberalism and colonialism in the crisis of African values. In film, the English translation of the proverb lent its hand to forming the title of Madonna's 2008 documentary, I Am Because We Are, about Malawian orphans.

Applications

In diplomacy 
In June 2009, in her swearing-in remarks as US Department of State Special Representative for Global Partnerships, Global Partnership Initiative, Office of the Secretary of State, Elizabeth Frawley Bagley discussed ubuntu in the context of American foreign policy, stating: "In understanding the responsibilities that come with our interconnectedness, we realize that we must rely on each other to lift our World from where it is now to where we want it to be in our lifetime, while casting aside our worn out preconceptions, and our outdated modes of statecraft." She then introduced the notion of "Ubuntu Diplomacy" with the following words:

In education 
In education, ubuntu has been used to guide and promote African education, and to decolonise it from western educational philosophies. Ubuntu education uses the family, community, society, environment and spirituality as sources of knowledge but also as teaching and learning media. The essence of education is family, community, societal and environmental well-being. Ubuntu education is about learners becoming critical about their social conditions. Interaction, participation, recognition, respect and inclusion are important aspects of ubuntu education. Methods of teaching and learning include groups and community approaches. The objectives, content, methodology and outcomes of education are shaped by ubuntu.

In social work, welfare and development 
This refers to Afrocentric ways of providing a social safety net to vulnerable members of society. Common elements include collectivity. The approach helps to "validate worldview and traditions suppressed by Western Eurocentric cultural hegemony". It is against materialism and individualism. It looks at an individual person as holistically. The social interventions done by social workers, welfare workers and development workers should strengthen, not weaken families, communities, society, the environment and peoples's spirituality. These are the five pillars of ubuntu intervention: family, community, society, environment and spirituality. Ubuntu is the current theme for the Global Agenda for Social Work and Social Development and represents the highest level of global messaging within social work profession for the years 2020–2030 . Utilising the biopsychosocial and ecological system approaches, ubuntu is a philosophy that is applicable in clinical social work in mental health.

In research 
Ubuntu can guide research objectives, ethics and methodology. Using ubuntu research approach provides researchers with an African oriented tool that decolonises research agenda and methodology. The objectives of ubuntu research are to empower families, communities and society at large. In doing ubuntu research, the position of the researcher is important because it helps create research relationships. The agenda of the research belongs to the community, and true participation is highly valued. Ujamaa is valued, it means pulling together or collaboration.

In moral philosophy 
According to this philosophy, "actions are right roughly insofar as they are a matter of living harmoniously with others or honouring communal relationships", "One's ultimate goal should be to become a full person, a real self or a genuine human being". Ukama, i.e. relationships are important. Among the Shona people, for example, when a person dies, his or her property is shared amongst relatives and there are culturally approved ways of doing this. The practice is called kugova. Samkange (1980)'s maxim on morality says “If and when one is faced with a decisive choice between wealth and the preservation of the life of another human being, then one should opt for the preservation of life”.

In politics and leadership 
Samkange (1980) said no foreign political philosophy can be useful in a country more than the indigenous philosophies. "Is there a philosophy or ideology indigenous to (a) country that can serve its people just as well, if not better than, foreign ideologies?", asked Samkange in the book Hunhuism or Ubuntuism. His maxim for leadership is “The king owes his status, including all the powers associated with it, to the will of the people under him”.

In social justice, criminal justice and jurisprudence 
Ubuntu justice has elements different from western societies: it values repairing relationships. Ubuntu justice emphasises these elements:
 Deterrence which can be done socially, physically, economically or spiritually
 Returning and Replacement - meaning bring back what has been stolen, replacing it or compensating. In Shona language this is called kudzora and kuripa
 Apology, Forgiveness and Reconciliation (restoration of ukama or relations) after meeting the above
 Warnings and Punishments (retribution) from leaders and elders if the above have not been achieved or ignored
 Warnings and Punishments from spiritual beings if the above have not been met. In Shona culture, these are called jambwa and ngozi

Families, and at times community are involved in the process of justice.

African scholars have noted that while some elements of Ubuntu are liberating to women, others "marginalize and disempower" them, and "can be seen as engendering patriarchy".

In popular culture

Ubuntu was a major theme in John Boorman's 2004 film In My Country. Former US president Bill Clinton used the term at the 2006 Labour Party conference in the UK to explain why society is important.

The Boston Celtics, the 2008 NBA champions, have chanted "ubuntu" when breaking a huddle since the start of the 2007–2008 season. The first episode of the 2020 Netflix docuseries The Playbook shows how Boston Celtic's coach, Glenn Anton "Doc" Rivers learned of the Ubuntu philosophy. The documentary then explores the impact of the philosophy on the team members and how it became their guiding principle.

At the 2002 UN World Summit on Sustainable Development (WSSD), there was an Ubuntu Village exposition centre. Ubuntu was the theme of the 76th General Convention of the American Episcopal Church. The logo includes the text "I in You and You in Me".

In October 2004 Mark Shuttleworth, a South African entrepreneur and owner of UK based company Canonical Ltd., founded the Ubuntu Foundation that is the company behind the creation of a computer operating system based on Debian GNU/Linux. He named the Linux distribution Ubuntu.

In film, the English translation of the proverb lent its hand to forming the title of pop singer Madonna's documentary, I Am Because We Are about Malawian orphans.

A character in the 2008 animated comedy The Goode Family is named Ubuntu.

Ubuntu was the title and theme of an EP released by British band Clockwork Radio in 2012.

Ubuntu was the title of an EP released by American rapper Sage Francis in 2012.

Ubuntu was chosen as the name of a clan of meerkats in the 2021 season of Meerkat Manor: Rise of the Dynasty.

See also

Traditional African religions
African philosophy
Bantu peoples
Nguni languages
Africanization
Decolonisation
Ethic of reciprocity
Harambee (Kenyan/Swahili concept)
Humanity (virtue)
Negotiations to end apartheid in South Africa
Pan-Africanism
Ubuntu theology
Universalism
Social construction

Footnotes

References

Further reading

 Chasi, Colin (2021). Ubuntu for Warriors Trenton, NJ: Africa World Press.
 Mboti, N. (2014). "May the Real Ubuntu Please Stand Up?" Journal of Media Ethics 30(2), pp. 125–147.
Battle, Michael (2007). Reconciliation: The ubuntu theology of Desmond Tutu. Pilgrim Press. 
 Blackwood, Alecia, "Transformative Learning: Improving Teachers' Cultural Competencies Through Knowledge and Practice of Ubuntu Pedagogy" (2018). Electronic Theses and Dissertations. 6056. https://stars.library.ucf.edu/etd/6056
Eze, Michael Onyebuchi (2017). "I am Because You Are: Cosmopolitanism in the Age of Xenophobia", Philosophical Papers, 46:1, 85-109
Eze, Michael Onyebuchi (2010). Intellectual history in contemporary South Africa. Palgrave Macmillan. .
Eze, Michael Onyebuchi (2008). "What is African Comunitarianism? Against consensus as a regulative Ideal", South African Journal of Philosophy, Vol. 27:4, pp. 386–399
Forster, Dion (2006). Self validating consciousness in strong artificial intelligence: An African theological contribution. Pretoria: Doctoral Dissertation, University of South Africa / UNISA, an extensive and detailed discussion of ubuntu in chapters 5–6.
Forster, Dion (2006). Identity in relationship: The ethics of ubuntu as an answer to the impasse of individual consciousness (Paper presented at the South African science and religion Forum – Published in the book The impact of knowledge systems on human development in Africa. du Toit, CW (ed.), Pretoria, Research institute for Religion and Theology (University of South Africa) 2007:245–289).Pretoria: UNISA. Dion Forster
 Gade, C. B. N. (2017). A Discourse on African Philosophy: A New Perspective on Ubuntu and Transitional Justice in South Africa. New York: Lexington Books.
 Gade, C. B. N. (2011). "The historical development of the written discourses on ubuntu", South African Journal of Philosophy, 30(3), 303–329.
 Kamwangamalu, Nkonko M. (2014). Ubuntu in South Africa: A sociolinguistic perspective to a pan-African concept. In Molefi Kete Asante, Yoshitaka Miike, & Jing Yin (eds), The global intercultural communication reader (2nd edn, pp. 226–236). New York, NY: Routledge.
 Louw, Dirk J. 1998. "Ubuntu: An African Assessment of the Religious Other". Twentieth World Congress of Philosophy.
 Metz, Thaddeus 2007, "Toward an African Moral Theory" (Symposium) S. Afr. J. Philos. 2007, 26(4).
 Ramose, Mogobe B. (2003). "The philosophy of ubuntu and ubuntu as a philosophy". In P. H. Coetzee & A. P. J. Roux (eds), The African philosophy reader (2nd edn, pp. 230–238). New York/London: Routledge.
 Samkange, S., & T. M. Samkange (1980). Hunhuism or ubuntuism: A Zimbabwe Indigenous Political Philosophy. Salisbury [Harare]: Graham Publishing, . 106pp. Paperback.
 Sesanti, Simphiwe. (2022). Humane communication in African languages: African philosophical perspectives. In Yoshitaka Miike & Jing Yin (Eds.), The handbook of global interventions in communication theory (pp. 122–135). New York, NY: Routledge.
Education. Rotterdam: Sense Publishers, pp. 27–38. https://www.sensepublishers.com/catalogs/bookseries/other-books/decolonizing-global-citizenship-education/
Chigangaidze, Robert Kudakwashe. (2021). "An exposition of humanistic-existential social work in light of ubuntu philosophy: Towards theorizing ubuntu in social work practice". Journal of Religion & Spirituality in Social Work: Social Thought, 40 (2), 146–165.
 Ukpokodu, O. N. (2016). You can't teach us if you don't know us and care about us: Becoming an ubuntu, responsive and responsible urban teacher. Peter Lang International Academic Publishers.

External links

 
 Ubuntu Party
 Ubuntu Planet
 Magolego, Melo. 2013. "Ubuntu in Western Society", M&G Thought Leader Blog
 Sonal Panse, Ubuntu – African Philosophy (buzzle.com)
 Sean Coughlan, "All you need is ubuntu", BBC News Magazine, Thursday, 28 September 2006.
 A. Onomen Asikele, Ubuntu Republics of Africa (2011)

Humanism
Social ethics
Ethical schools and movements
Decolonization
African philosophy
Pan-Africanism
African and Black nationalism
Politics of South Africa
Politics of Zimbabwe
Articles containing video clips
Bantu
Political terminology in South Africa